Juan José Colomer (born Juan José Revueltas Colomer in Alzira, Valencia, Spain, 1966) is a Spanish composer.

Personal life 
Juan Colomer started his music studies at age eight in his local music school, "Sociedad Musical de Alzira." He continued his studies in the Conservatorio Superior de Música de Valencia, where he graduated in trumpet and composition. In 1990 he moved to Boston where he studied Film Scoring at Berklee College of Music.

In 1992 he moved to Los Angeles, his actual residence, where he started working as a film composer, as well as arranging and producing for other artists. He has worked and collaborated with artists like Alejandro Fernández, Bebu Silvetti, Juan Carlos Calderón, Vinnie Colaiuta, and Ramón Flores.

In 1999 he recorded a CD with his own songs in Spanish, under the name of Bella y oscura, entitled "Reina en prisión" (queen in prison) with Esmeralda Grao as the lead singer.

In 2006 he became an American citizen and now has dual Spanish-American citizenship.

He is also known by his nickname in Spain Juanjo Colomer.

Career 

His classical work, as a composer or orchestrator, has been performed and recorded by James Levine, Plácido Domingo, José Carreras, Christian Lindberg, Los Angeles Philharmonic, San Francisco Symphony, Vienna Symphony orchestra, Orchestre de Paris, Simón Bolívar Youth Orchestra, Orchestra & choir of the Arena di Verona, Russian National Orchestra, Orquesta de la Comunidad Valenciana, Orquesta de Castilla y León and Spanish Brass. He has worked regularly with Plácido Domingo as an orchestrator for the Christmas in Vienna series of concerts, as well as The three tenors concerts in Paris 1998 and Monterrey in 2005, the Arena de Verona and the Operalia anthem. Recently he arranged and orchestrated several of the tracks for the CD Pasión española (Spanish passion) with Plácido Domingo and the Orquesta de la Comunidad de Madrid conducted by Miguel Roa, for the Deutsche Grammophon label. This CD won a Grammy for Best Classical Album at the 2008 Latin Grammy Awards.

Juan J. Colomer has received commissions from the National orchestra of Spain (OCNE), International Horn Symposium, Center for Contemporary Music (CDMC), International Philip Jones competition (Guebwiller, France) and Instituto Valenciano de la Música (IVM).

In 1991 he won a composition prize in Madrid for his piece "Añoranzas" for Harp. He was also nominated for two consecutive years for an Euterpe award by the Federación de sociedades musicales valencianas for his piece "Raíces" for best symphonic work.

In 2010 he created a non profit organization called "Artistic Soirées" that hosts monthly concerts in Los Angeles. He is the co-founder, with conductor Ignazio Terrasi, of the LA Grand Ensemble, a flexible formation that incorporates visual elements into their concerts.

His works have been performed at prestigious halls like Carnegie Hall (NY), Tchaikovsky Concert Hall (Moscow), Teatro Real (Madrid) or Walt Disney Concert Hall (Los Angeles).

Juan Colomer publishes his works with Editions BIM of Switzerland, Editorial Piles, Tritó, and Rivera editores in Spain.

Compositions

Operas 
 El Pintor, symphonic opera in 3 acts
 Dulcinea XL, chamber opera in 2 acts

Ballets 
 Sorolla

Vocal orchestral works 
 Agua que no has de beber, for choir & orchestra
 Fallen Angels, Oratorio for soloists, choir & orchestra

Orchestral works 
 A casual walk to extinction
 Air in light of darkness
 Convergencias
 Ciento Volando
 Escaping insanity
 Escenas pintorescas (Picturesque scenes)
 Esperpento cubista
 La ancestral letania, for viola & orchestra
 La complicidad del espectro
 La Devota Lasciva, for brass quintet & orchestra
 Naturaleza Humana, for horn, choir of horns & orchestra
 Preludio de Dulcinea
 Sorolla breve suite
 Symphonic genesis
 Symphonic vignettes, for trumpet & orchestra
 Adagio, for strings
 Concerto Nº 1, for piano & orchestra

Works for symphony wind orchestra 
 Raices
 Chova
 Feb 93
 Josep Pau

Vocal works 
 Ave Maria, for soprano & orchestra
 Canciones de entretiempo
 Canciones en femenino
 Lied, for soprano & piano
 Magnificat, Choir SATB & brass quintet
 Silent ceremony, Children's chorus, mixed chorus, oboe, harp & organ

Chamber music 
 Comfortably familiar (and peacefully numb), String quartet & piano
 Como pez en su pecera, for brass trio & percussion
 Concerto breve, for solo trombone
 Danzas Anacrónicas, for violin, cello & piano
 Decadence, for oboe, horn & piano
 Dialogos inmencionables, for solo trombone & brass quintet
 Downtown Bagatelles, for violin & piano
 Easy pieces for professional musicians, Viola & piano
 EB-1, for violin & piano
 Fierabrass, for brass ensemble
 Gabrieli según San Juan
 Gestas de un Don Nadie, for solo trumpet & brass quintet
 Historia de un muntante, for brass quintet
 Lisonjas de la alcahueta, for euphonium & brass quintet
 Los cinco mosqueteros, for brass quintet
 Mar sin Luna, Horn & Piano (also cello & piano)
 Obertura y Chacona, for trumpet & organ
 Obsession, for two violins & piano
 Patterns of behavior, String quartet, clarinet & Vibraphone/Marimba
 Quintet, for five flutes
 Realidades disipadas, for cello & piano
 Semana Santa en Gomorra, for large ensemble
 Separation, for violin & piano
 Sonata, for trumpet & piano
 The allure of despair, for violin, cello & piano
 The charlatan's daughter, for 2 solo trombones & brass quintet
 The existential tourist, for cello & piano
 Thelma & Louise on a Vespa, 2 trombones & piano
 Tiempos, for string quartet
 The exile of time, for string quartet
 Trio, for flute, viola & harp
 Visions, for horn & piano
 Viveros, for flute, cello & piano

Works for piano 
 Autumn notebook
 El ladrón de memorias, for solo piano
 Influjo, for solo piano
 Decadence, for oboe, horn & piano
 EB-1, for violin & piano
 Realidades disipadas, for cell & piano
 Sonata, for trumpet & piano
 Viveros, for flute, cello & piano

Works for harp 
 Trio, for flute, viola & harp
 Añoranzas

Film music  
 A day without a Mexican
 A letter to Rachel
 Acts of love
 Aimee Price
 Bobby
 CNB
 Cronique de la Decouverte
 Dangerous cargo
 Dark honeymoon
 Distorted Images
 Double or nothing
 Fat free
 First date
 For better and for worse
 Getting Rachel back
 Invisible temptation
 Last Kill
 Learning to lead
 Luna
 Maradentro
 Mulholland ceremonies
 Pacifico inedito
 Rewrite
 Shakespeare...in & out
 Sunsplit
 Sylvia's Baklava
 Ten seconds
 The box
 The Crimson hour
 The Mexican dream
 The Wall
 Three short pieces
 Yellow belle

References

External links
Official website

myspace page
Editions BIM
Deutsche Grammophon (Plácido Domingo)
Rivera Editores
Editorial Tritó/Amalgama
Editorial Piles
Artistic Soirées
LA Grand Ensemble

1966 births
Living people
Spanish classical composers
Spanish male classical composers
Composers from the Valencian Community